Herbert Blankenhorn (15 December 1904 in Mülhausen – 10 August 1991 in Badenweiler) was a German diplomat. From 1929 he was member of the Foreign Office, and from 1938 was a member of the Nazi Party (NSDAP). At the time, he was counsellor in the German legation in Bern, Switzerland. Philippe Mottu had been encouraged by Canon de Bavier, the Procurator of the Abbey of St. Maurice in the Vatican, to meet him as he was in reality an anti-Nazi. Mottu says, 'At the moment when the Third Reich was triumphant on the battlefield, he explained to me why, according to his conviction, Germany was going to lose the war. It was my first contact with one of the men who took part in the German resistance.' [Philippe Mottu, ‘Caux is the place!’, Caux Doc, 1997, p. 10-11]  According to Roger Peyrefitte in Propos Secrets volume 2, Blankenhorn was a German diplomat at the embassy in Greece, where they became lovers in the 1930s. In 1943, he launched the economy department of the German legation in Bern and was Head of the Foreign Office. After 1945 he became one of the most influential German professional diplomats. He joined the CDU in 1946 and served as the West German ambassador to Italy, France(1963-1965) and the United Kingdom (1965–1970).
He was the son of officer Karl Blankenhorn (1878-1963).

References

1904 births
1991 deaths
People from Mulhouse
Nazi Party politicians
Ambassadors of West Germany to the United Kingdom
Ambassadors of West Germany to France
Ambassadors of West Germany to Italy
Grand Crosses with Star and Sash of the Order of Merit of the Federal Republic of Germany
Permanent Representatives of West Germany to NATO